Kenneth AJ Parr Sr. (born 1962) is a male retired British sport shooter.

Sport shooting career
He represented England and won two bronze medals in the 50 metres rifle 3 position and pair, at the 1998 Commonwealth Games in Kuala Lumpur, Malaysia.

Personal life
He is the father of the four times Commonwealth Games medallist Kenneth Parr.

External links

References

1962 births
Living people
British male sport shooters
Commonwealth Games medallists in shooting
Commonwealth Games bronze medallists for England
Shooters at the 1998 Commonwealth Games
20th-century British people
Medallists at the 1998 Commonwealth Games